The Steam Horse was constructed by the Butterley Company in Derbyshire in 1813 by William Brunton (1777–1851). Also known as the Mechanical Traveller, it had a pair of mechanical legs, with feet that gripped the rails at the rear of the engine to push it forwards at about three miles an hour.

Design
The collieries were well served between towns by the canal system. From the pit head to the canals,  horse-drawn wagonways had been constructed and steam engines were seen as no more than a noisy and dangerous novelty. However the Napoleonic Wars from 1799 to 1815 had brought a great increase in the price of fodder. Moreover, some such "railways" were being constructed on the steeper gradients within canals, as for instance on the Charnwood Forest Canal.

Nobody  believed that steel wheels on smooth steel rails would give enough adhesion until Robert Stephenson and William Hedley proved otherwise in 1813 and even the former considered 1 in 100 (1%) was the absolute maximum grade. Consequently such steam operated systems as there were, were operated by cumbersome cables, or by the use of an expensive rack and pinion.

Crich
Brunton took out a patent, No. 3700, dated 22 May 1813 for the locomotive. The Butterley locomotive cost a total of £240.

Newbottle
The historical record is scanty but it seems that the Steam Horse operated successfully for an unknown period. So much so, that another, larger, one with a 9 ft boiler rather than the original 5 ft, seems to have been built for the Newbottle Colliery, in County Durham. This locomotive cost £540 and may have had two cylinders. On 31 July 1815, during a demonstration, the new wrought iron boiler exploded, killing thirteen spectators and injuring several others. The reason was that the safety valves had been screwed down too tightly and were therefore not working. The idea was not pursued afterwards. This incident was the first recorded railway disaster.

References

 Loughnan St. L.Pendred (1921) A Note on Brunton's Steam Horse, 1813,Transactions of The Newcomen Society  02 (1921) : 118-120 available on line

Early steam locomotives
Individual locomotives of Great Britain
Railway boiler explosions
Railway accidents and incidents in County Durham
Explosions in England
Explosions in 1815
Railway accidents in 1815
Walking vehicles